Rhododendron tomentosum (syn. Ledum palustre), commonly known as marsh Labrador tea, northern Labrador tea or wild rosemary, is a flowering plant in the subsection Ledum of the large genus Rhododendron in the family Ericaceae.

Description
It is a low shrub growing to 50 cm (rarely up to 120 cm) tall with evergreen leaves 12–50 mm long and 2–12 mm broad. The flowers are small, with a five-lobed white corolla, and produced several together in a corymb 3–5 cm diameter. They emit strong smell to attract bees and other pollinating insects.

Distribution and habitat
It grows in northern latitudes in North America, Greenland, Canada, and Alaska, in Europe in the northern and central parts, and in Asia south to northern China, Korea and Japan. It grows in peaty soils, shrubby areas, moss and lichen tundra.

Chemical compounds
All parts of the plant contain poisonous terpenes that affect the central nervous system. First symptoms of overdose are dizziness and disturbances in movement, followed by spasms, nausea, and unconsciousness. Among the plant's terpenes is ledol a cyclic alcohol with deliriant effects, although poisonous in large doses.

Similar species
This species is not to be confused with the traditionally-used one Rhododendron groenlandicum, found throughout Northern North America.

Uses

Herbal medicine
Rhododendron tomentosum is used in herbalism to make an herbal tea called "Labrador tea". Some schools of homeopathy consider Rhododendron tomentosum to be a specific remedy for puncture wounds produced by sharp-pointed objects or bites. However, no objective material benefit has ever been documented in any properly controlled study to date.

Other uses
Marsh Labrador tea has traditionally been used as a gruit in brewing beer in the Middle Ages. Due to its strong fragrance, it has also formerly been used as a natural deterrent against clothes moths, also mosquitos and bugs in general, in Scandinavia and in Eastern Europe.

References

External links 

Flora of China: Ledum palustre
USDA PLANTS database: Ledum palustre
Den virtuella floran: Distribution

tomentosum
Herbal tea
Medicinal plants
Flora of Japan
Flora of Korea
Flora of Norway
Flora of Germany
Flora of Russia
Flora of North America
Flora of Greenland